Nan Phinney (born 1945) is a retired American accelerator physicist at SLAC. She was program coordinator for the Stanford Linear Collider (SLC), the world's first linear collider. Her research interests are high energy colliders and linear colliders. She became an American Physical Society Fellow in 1993. Her last job title at SLAC was "Distinguished Staff Scientist".

Early life and education 
Born in Chicago in 1945, Nan Phinney is the daughter of Thomas Ward Phinney, who trained as an electrical engineer, and Martha Louise (née Lawrence) Phinney. She is a granddaughter of photographer George R. Lawrence.

The family lived on the north side of Chicago, where she attended Catholic grammar school and Catholic girls' high school.

Phinney completed a Bachelor of Science in Physics and Astronomy in 1966 at Michigan State University. She earned an M.S. in 1968, and a Ph.D. in 1972, both degrees in High Energy Physics at the State University of New York, Stony Brook. Her  dissertation was Trident Production in Coulomb Field, advised by John (Jack) Smith.

Career

Post doctoral positions 
From 1972 through 1980, Phinney held post doc positions from École Polytechnique and the University of Oxford, working at CERN on high-energy particle physics experiments. Initially she worked on the hyperon experiment on the Proton Synchrotron, butf or most of her time at CERN she worked with the CERN, Columbia, Oxford, Rockefeller group in IR-1 of the Intersecting Storage Rings. The group studied wide-angle scattering, and Phinney's work was primarily data acquisition.

Stanford Linear Accelerator Center 

In 1981 Phinney was one of the first physicists hired to work on the Stanford Linear Collider (SLC), the world's first linear collider. With technical expertise and leadership qualities, she became SLC program coordinator from 1990 to 1998. She led the effort "to make the accelerator perform — an enormous challenge that took constant effort", according to Burt Richter. Prof. David Burke said she "became an international spokesperson for the new technology as a result of her scientific expertise as well as her ability to talk to audiences ranging from scientists to government officials".

In 2004 Phinney was elected chair of the Division of the Physics of Beams executive committee of the American Physical Society. She has served on the second International Linear Collider Technical Review Committee as well as the U.S. Linear Collider Steering Group Accelerator Task Force and the United Kingdom Linear Collider Machine Advisory Committee. According to Richter, she has brought "her hard-won wisdom and experience on linear colliders to the worldwide linear collider design efforts".

Awards, honors 

 1993 American Physical Society Fellow, cited "For her many contributions to the successful development and operation of the Stanford Linear Collider".
 2003 Marsh O’Neill Award recipient

Selected publications

References

External links 
 
 Nan Phinney Symposium, 2018

1945 births
Living people
20th-century American physicists
21st-century American women scientists
21st-century American physicists
Accelerator physicists
American women physicists
Fellows of the American Physical Society
Michigan State University alumni
People associated with CERN
Particle physicists
Stony Brook University alumni
20th-century American women scientists